Gila Almagor Agmon (born Gila Alexandrowitz; July 22, 1939) is an Israeli actress, film star, and author. In Israel, she is known as "queen of the Israeli cinema and theatre".

Biography
Gila Alexandrowitz (Almagor) was born in Petah Tikva to Jewish emigrant parents from Europe. Her German-Jewish father Max Alexandrowitz was killed by an Arab sniper while working as a policeman in Haifa four months before she was born.  Her mother Chaya was from a Polish Orthodox Jewish family. Almagor grew up caring for her mother, who was slowly losing her sanity after realising that all her family in Europe had been murdered in the Holocaust. When her mother was institutionalized in 1954, Almagor was sent to Hadassim youth village.

Two years later, she moved to Tel Aviv, rented a room near Habima Theatre, and applied to acting school. Although she was underage, she was accepted.

At the age of 17, Almagor debuted in Habima's production of The Skin of Our Teeth.  Her autobiographical books Summer of Aviya and Under the Domim Tree were both made into films, with Almagor playing her own mother. She was married to Yaakov Agmon, former director of the Habima Theatre, until his death in 2020. They have two children.

Stage, film and television
Almagor has played leading roles in many plays, among them Anne Frank, Jeanne d'Arc, The Crucible, Three Sisters, The Bride and the Butterfly Hunt, They Were All My Children, and Medea. She has appeared in over 50 films,  including Siege, Queen of the Road, The House on Chelouche Street, Hide and Seek, El Dorado, Life According to Agfa and The Summer of Aviya.

Almagor starred as the mother of Avner, the main character in the 2005 film Munich. She also appears in The Debt, about a former Mossad agent who comes back to kill an escaped Nazi doctor. In 2008, she played the role of Lolah Baum in the 100-episode serial Dani Hollywood, broadcast on the Yes satellite network. In 2005, Almagor played a therapist in the award-winning Israeli television series BeTipul.

Charity work and public service
Almagor founded the Gila Almagor Wish Fund, a charity for sick children, and co-founded AMI – the Israeli Artist Association. She currently serves as chair of cultural activities in the City Council of Tel Aviv and many other boards to promote the arts for children and in efforts to make international exchange between the Israeli performing arts world and abroad.

Awards and critical acclaim
Almagor has received 10 Kinor David awards for her work in film and theater.

She received the Life Achievement Award at the Jerusalem Film Festival in 1996, a Life Achievement Award from the Israeli Academy of Cinema in 1997, and the Silver Bear award for best actress in Summer of Aviya at the Berlin Film Festival.

In 1995, Almagor received a National Jewish Book Award for Under the Domin Tree.

In 1993, she was a member of the jury at the 18th Moscow International Film Festival. In 1996, she was a member of the jury at the 46th Berlin International Film Festival.

In 1990, she was chosen Actress of the Decade by Yediot Ahronoth and the Israel Film Institute. In 2004, she was awarded the Israel Prize, for cinema. In 2005, she received a Hans Christian Andersen Ambassadorship. In 2007, she was awarded the Liberitas Film Festival Prize for Lifetime Achievement (Croatia). In 2009, Ben-Gurion University of the Negev and Tel Aviv University awarded her an honorary doctorate.

Filmography
 El Dorado (1963), as Margo
 Sallah Shabati (1964), as Batsheva Ha'Sosialit (social worker)
 Trunk to Cairo (1965), as Yasmin
 The House on Chelouche Street (1973), as Clara
 Life According to Agfa (1993), as Daliah
 Munich (2005), as Avner's Mother

See also

List of Israel Prize recipients
Women of Israel

References

External links

Gila Almagor's Short Bio in Hebrew

1939 births
Israeli children's writers
Israeli film actresses
Israeli stage actresses
Israeli television actresses
Israeli people of German-Jewish descent
Israeli people of Polish-Jewish descent
Israel Prize in cinema recipients
Israel Prize women recipients
Jewish Israeli actresses
Jewish Israeli writers
Jewish novelists
Jewish women writers
Living people
Israeli women children's writers
Israeli women novelists